John Roche (February 6, 1893 – November 10, 1952) was an American actor of the stage and screen.

Biography
Roche was born in the small village of Penn Yan, New York, on February 6, 1893. He graduated from the University of Rochester, after which he began his acting career touring with stock companies during the 1910s and early 1920s. In 1922, he broke into the film industry with a featured role in The Good Provider. During the 1920s, he acted in both films and on stage, including several roles in Broadway productions. He acted steadily in films until 1936, in both featured and supporting roles. In the mid-1930s he took a break from films, focusing on the stage, including directing the play, Mackerel Skies, which had a short run at the Playhouse Theatre in New York in 1936. Roche returned to films in 1941, with a small role in the Norma Shearer vehicle, We Were Dancing (1942), based on the Noël Coward play of the same name. Over the course of his career he was involved in over six Broadway productions and appeared in over 50 films. His final screen appearance was in 1946's The Brute Man.

Roche died on November 10, 1952, in Los Angeles, California.

Filmography

(According to AFI database)

 The Good Provider (1922)   	
 Bag and Baggage (1923) 	
 Lucretia Lombard (1923)   	
 Cornered (1924)   	
 Flowing Gold (1924)   	
 Her Marriage Vow (1924)   	
 K – The Unknown (1924)  	
 A Lost Lady (1924)   	
 The Tenth Woman (1924)   	
 Bobbed Hair (1925)   	
 A Broadway Butterfly (1925)   	
 Kiss Me Again (1925)   	
 The Love Hour (1925)   	
 Marry Me (1925)   	
 My Wife and I (1925)   	
 Recompense (1925)   	
 Scandal Proof (1925)   	
 Her Big Night (1926)   	
 The Man Upstairs (1926)   	
 Midnight Lovers (1926)   	
 The Return of Peter Grimm (1926)   	
 The Truthful Sex (1926)	
 Don Juan (1927)   	
 Diamond Handcuffs (1928)   	
 Uncle Tom's Cabin (1928)   	
 Their Hour (1928)   	
 The Awful Truth (1929)   	
 The Donovan Affair (1929)   	
 The Dream Melody (1929) 	
 This Thing Called Love (1929)   	
 The Unholy Night (1929)   	
 Monte Carlo (1930)   	
 Sin Takes a Holiday (1930)   	
 The Cohens and Kellys in Hollywood (1932)   	
 Winner Take All (1932)   	
 Lady with a Past (1932)   	
 Prosperity (1932)   	
 Beauty for Sale (1933)   	
 Redheads on Parade (1935)   	
 Just My Luck (1936)   	
 Nobody's Fool (1936)   	
 Klondike Fury (1942)   	
 My Gal Sal (1942)   	
 Springtime in the Rockies (1942)   	
 Sunday Punch (1942)   	
 We Were Dancing (1942)   	
 Her Primitive Man (1944)   	
 The Spider Woman (1944)   	
 Atlantic City (1944)   	
 It's a Pleasure! (1945)   	
 State Fair (1945)   	
 Where Do We Go from Here? (1945)   	
 The Brute Man (1946)   	
 The Dark Horse (1946)   	
 Idea Girl (1946)

References

External links

1893 births
1952 deaths
American male stage actors
American male silent film actors
20th-century American male actors
American directors
American male film actors
People from Penn Yan, New York